The Internet Encyclopedia of Philosophy (IEP) is a scholarly online encyclopedia, dealing with philosophy, philosophical topics, and philosophers. The IEP combines open access publication with peer reviewed publication of original papers. Contribution is generally by invitation, and contributors are recognized and leading international specialists within their field.

History
The IEP was founded by philosopher James Fieser in 1995, operating through a non-profit organization with the aim of providing accessible and scholarly information on philosophy. The current general editors are philosophers James Fieser and Bradley Dowden, with the staff also including numerous area editors as well as volunteers. The entire website was redesigned in the summer of 2009, moving from static HTML pages to the open-source publishing platform WordPress.

Organization 
The intended audience for the IEP is philosophy students and faculty who are not specialists within the field, and thus articles are written in an accessible style. Articles consist of a brief survey or overview, followed by the body of the article, and an annotated bibliography. Articles are searchable either by an alphabetical index or through a Google-power search mechanism.

Usage
Similarweb analytics suggest that the IEP website is accessed worldwide between two and three million times per month. Some 75% of this usage is through internet searches, 18% is through direct access, and 5% through referral, with the referring websites including other reference websites and university library guides.

Recognition
The IEP is included by the American Library Association in its listing of Best Free Reference Sites; listed as an online philosophy resource by the Federation of Australasian Philosophy in Schools Associations; listed by EpistemeLinks as one of the "outstanding resources" in philosophy on the internet; and listed as a reliable resource in many university philosophy guides.

See also
 Encyclopedia of Philosophy
 Routledge Encyclopedia of Philosophy
 Stanford Encyclopedia of Philosophy
 List of online encyclopedias

References

External links
 

Online encyclopedias
Encyclopedias of philosophy
Internet properties established in 1995
1995 establishments in the United States
Philosophy websites
20th-century encyclopedias
American online encyclopedias